Nordic Steel Entertainment is a Swedish-based record label founded in 2006 by Spitfiyah, Iman Russ and Jatrix.

Nordic Steel consists of three members – Henrik “Spitfiyah” Persson, Jens “Jatrix” Landegren and Iman “Russ” Esmaeilpour. Spitfiyah was brought together with Jatrix and Iman Russ through the renowned swedish artist Million Stylez around the year 2000. At the time Million, Jatrix and Russ just came out of the hiphop group Soundaddicts. While Spitfiyah came out of being a selector together with the now well known Dj Flash out of Stockholm Sweden. Soon after they formed the Nordic Steel producer team, while Million Stylez continued as artist on his own road. Nordic Steel has since worked closely with artists like Jah Knight, Rebellious, Richie Riott and many more. Previous work also include big artists like Munga, Turbulence, TOK, Cecile and more.

Music produced by Nordic Steel

References 

Swedish record labels